Juni is an album by drummer Peter Erskine featuring pianist John Taylor and bassist Palle Danielsson recorded in 1997 and released on the ECM label

Reception 
The Allmusic review by Jim Newsom awarded the album 3½ stars stating "A beautiful collection full of subtlety and nuance... soft, spatial, melodic, and accessible".

Track listing 
All compositions by Peter Erskine except as indicated.

 "Prelude No. 2" (John Taylor) - 5:37 
 "Windfall" - (Taylor) - 6:17 
 "For Jan" - (Kenny Wheeler) - 6:45 
 "The Ant & the Elk" - 7:08 
 "Siri" - 6:33 
 "Fable" (Taylor) - 5:32 
 "Twelve" - 7:20 
 "Namasti" (Taylor) - 5:28

Personnel 
 Peter Erskine — drums
John Taylor — piano 
Palle Danielsson — bass

References 

ECM Records albums
Peter Erskine albums
1999 albums
Albums produced by Manfred Eicher